Basketball at the Games of the Small States of Europe has been contested at all the editions of the Games of the Small States of Europe except at the ones hosted in Liechtenstein.

Men's tournament

Performance by country

Participation details

Women's tournament

Performance by country

Participation details

References

Times of Malta
Cypriot Olympic Committee 
Iceland basketball teams results

External links
Athletic Association of the Small States of Europe

 
Basketball competitions in Europe between national teams